Cristisse bicristata is a species of beetle in the family Cerambycidae, and the only species in the genus Cristisse. It was described by Breuning in 1955.

References

Acanthocinini
Beetles described in 1955
Monotypic Cerambycidae genera
Taxa named by Stephan von Breuning (entomologist)